Armillaria apalosclerus is a species of mushroom in the family Physalacriaceae. This species is found in Asia.

See also 
 List of Armillaria species

References 

Fungal tree pathogens and diseases
apalosclera
Taxa named by Miles Joseph Berkeley
Fungi of Asia